Kennet Dancyger (born 1945 in Germany) is a scriptwriting theoretician, film historian and expert on film editing and film production. He is professor of film and TV at Maurice Kanbar Institute of Film, Television, & New Media, Undergraduate. He has been the president of University Film and Video Association. He has taught film in the U.S. and Canada since 1968.

His 2002 book contains a detailed comparison of screwball comedy and film noir.(p. 68) He has collaborated as historical consultant for the 2004 documentary The Cutting Edge: The Magic of Movie Editing, about the art of film editing.

Books
1991, with Jeff Rush, Alternative Scriptwriting: Writing Beyond the Rules. Editions: 2nd 1995 (new subtitle: Successfully Breaking the Rules), 3rd 2002, 4th 2006. Boston and Oxford: Focal Press
1991, Broadcast Writing: Drama, Comedies, and Documentaries
1993, The Technique of Film and Video Editing: History, Theory, and Practice. Editions: 2nd 1997, 3rd 2002, 4th 2006. Focal Press. 
1994, with Patricia Cooper, Writing the Short Film, Second Edition
1999, World of Film and Video Production: Aesthetics and Practice
2001, Global scriptwriting (reprinted in 2013) 
2006, The Director's Idea: The Path to Great Directing
2013, Alternative Scriptwriting: Beyond the Hollywood Formula  
2018, The Technique of Film and Video Editing: History, Theory, and Practice
2019, Storytelling for Film and Television: From First Word to Last Frame

See also
Nonlinear narrative

References

External links
Page at New York University
Interview

German film historians
Living people
Screenwriting instructors
American film historians
1945 births